Jason Cano (born in Houston, Texas), better known as DJ Kane, is an American
singer who was the lead vocalist for the Latin Grammy award winning A.B. Quintanilla y Los Kumbia Kings from 1999 to 2003 and A.B. Quintanilla y Los Kumbia All Starz from 2008 to 2010 and went on to become a successful solo artist.

Discography

 DJ Kane (2004)
 Capítulo II: Brinca (2005)
 Capítulo III: Ahogando Penas (2007)

References

External links
 Official Facebook

 
1975 births
20th-century American singers
21st-century American singers
American male singer-songwriters
American musicians of Mexican descent
Capitol Latin artists
Cumbia musicians
EMI Latin artists
Hispanic and Latino American musicians
Kumbia All Starz members
Kumbia Kings members
Living people
Musicians from Houston
People from Corpus Christi, Texas
Record producers from Texas
Spanish-language singers of the United States
Singer-songwriters from Texas